Andrei Aleksandrovich Romanov (born 4 August 1980) is a former Russian professional football player.

Club career
He played in the Russian Football National League for FC Tekstilshchik-Telekom Ivanovo in 2007.

Honours
 Russian Second Division, Zone West best goalkeeper: 2009, 2010.

References

External links
 

1980 births
Sportspeople from Ivanovo
Living people
Russian footballers
Association football goalkeepers
FC Oryol players
FC Tekstilshchik Ivanovo players
FC Shinnik Yaroslavl players
FC Spartak Kostroma players